The Louisville Division of Fire, commonly known as the Louisville Fire Department or Louisville Fire & Rescue (abbreviated LFD or LFR), is the sole fire suppression agency for the city of Louisville, Kentucky and is one of nineteen fire departments within the Louisville-Jefferson County, Kentucky metropolitan area. The Louisville Division of Fire is the second largest fire department in Kentucky behind Lexington Fire Department. The Louisville Division of Fire responded to 31,836 incidents in 2013.  the Chief of Department was Gregory Frederick.

History
The Louisville Fire Department is the third oldest all-paid staff fire department in the nation. The first fire brigades established in Louisville were in 1780, two years after the city's creation. The first firehouses in Louisville were volunteer fire departments scattered throughout the city until June 1, 1858, when the city took control and replaced the hand engines with five steam engines and volunteers with paid staff. There were initially three fire stations, 65 full-time firefighters, and 23 horses.

Operations
The Louisville Division of Fire currently operates out of 21 fire stations, located throughout the city in 4 battalions. Each battalion is commanded by a battalion chief. The 4 battalions are under the command of a citywide tour commander each shift. The Louisville Division of Fire operates 18 engine companies, 8 truck companies (including 3 quints), 2 rescue companies, 3 HazMat units, 3 fireboats, 1 ventilation unit, 3 utility mule ATVs, and numerous special, support, and reserve units.

Rescue Company 2 (housed with, and staffed by, the crews of Engine 2 and Truck 1) provides high-angle and dive rescue services. Rescue Company 11 (housed with, and staffed by, the crew of Quint 7) provides trench and structural collapse rescue services. Hazardous materials incidents are handled by Haz-Mat Companies 1, 19, and 21. Haz-Mat Company 1 is housed with Engine 1 adjacent the Louisville International Airport, Haz-Mat Company 19 is housed with Engine 19 in the city's west side, near the Rubbertown area, which is home to many industrial plants, and Haz-Mat Company 21 is housed with Engine 21 on the city's northeast side, near downtown.

Stations and apparatus
Below is a list of stations and apparatus in use by the Louisville Division of Fire.

See also
Historic Firehouses of Louisville
Louisville Firehouse No. 2
Steam Engine Company No. 7

References

Fire
Fire departments in Kentucky
Organizations established in 1858
1858 establishments in Kentucky